
This is a list of women's football clubs in Spain, for men's football clubs, see the list of football clubs in Spain.

By ranking in the top tier 
Starting from the creation of the Superliga in the 2001–02 and last updated at the end of the 2016–17 season.

 Athletic Bilbao

 Levante UD

 RCD Espanyol

 Rayo Vallecano

 FC Barcelona

 Atlético Madrid

 Real Sociedad

 CD Transportes Alcaine / Zaragoza CFF

 Sporting Huelva

 DSV Colegio Alemán / Valencia CF

 AD Torrejón

 CFF Puebla / Extremadura FCF / Extremadura UD

 Oviedo Moderno / Real Oviedo

 CD Híspalis

 UD Collerense

 UE L'Estartit

 CE Sant Gabriel

 Estudiantes Huelva

 CE Sabadell

 Sevilla FC

 Santa Teresa CD

 Atlético Málaga / Málaga CF

 UD Granadilla

 CF Pozuelo

 CD Nuestra Señora de Belén

 SP Comarca Llanos de Olivenza / CFF Badajoz-Olivenza / CD Badajoz

 Albacete Balompié

 Levante Las Planas

 UD Las Palmas

 SD Reocín

 Oiartzun KE

 Real Betis

 Granada CF

 Real Valladolid

 Peña Nuestra Señora de la Antigua

 FVPR El Olivo

 UD Tacuense

 SD Eibar

Alphabetically 

 
Spain women
clubs women